Lucille Kallen (May 28, 1922, Los Angeles, California – January 18, 1999, Ardsley, New York) was an American writer, screenwriter, playwright, composer, and lyricist.

She was best known for being the only woman in the most famous TV writers' room, the one that created Sid Caesar's Your Show of Shows from 1950 to 1954. She also worked extensively on Broadway, was a long-time writing partner of Mel Tolkin, and published six novels, including a series of mysteries featuring the character C.B. Greenfield. The Mystery Fancier discussed and reviewed her books, and one was quoted in English Historical Syntax and Morphology.

Sid Caesar's writer's room has been fictionally recreated many times. Neil Simon, one of the writers, memorialized it in his play Laughter on the 23rd Floor; it formed the centerpiece of the 1982 film My Favorite Year, and most famously, it was the office in which Rob Petrie worked in The Dick Van Dyke Show. Kallen and Selma Diamond, who were composited to make Rose Marie's character, Sally, were the only women writers on Your Show of Shows and Caesar's follow-up show, Caesar's Hour.

Bibliography
 Outside There, Somewhere!: A Novel (1964) later republished as Gentlemen Prefer Slaves (1973).
 Introducing C.B. Greenfield (1981)
 C.B. Greenfield: The Piano Bird (1984)
 C.B. Greenfield: The Tanglewood Murder (1985)
 C.B. Greenfield: A Little Madness (1986)

References

External links 
Lucille Kallen papers, 1938-1999, held by the Billy Rose Theatre Division, New York Public Library for the Performing Arts

1922 births
1999 deaths
20th-century American novelists
20th-century American women writers
American women novelists
American mystery novelists
Deaths from cancer in New York (state)
Writers from Los Angeles
American women television writers
Women mystery writers
Novelists from California
Screenwriters from California
American women screenwriters
American television writers
20th-century American screenwriters